Khant may refer to:

People 
 Khant caste, a Hindu caste in India
 Khanty people, in Russia

Surname 
 Aleksandr Khant (born 1985), Russian filmmaker
 Jeetmal Khant, Indian politician
 Savitaben Khant (died 2012), Indian politician

Other uses 
 Khant, Punjab, a village in India
 Khanty language